Fortrose was the terminus of a single track branch of the Highland Railway in north east Scotland. It connected villages in The Black Isle peninsula to the railway network via a junction at Muir of Ord.

Authorisation was obtained on 4 July 1890 to build a 15.75 mile (25 km) branch line from Muir of Ord to Rosemarkie; however the line never proceeded beyond Fortrose.

Other stations 

 Muir of Ord - still open
 Redcastle
 Allangrange
 Munlochy
 Avoch
 Fortrose - town

Notes

References
 Butt, R.V.J. (1995). The Directory of Railway Stations. Sparkford: Patrick Stephens Limited. .
 Vallance, H.A. (1985). The Highland Railway. 4th Extended edition: extra material by C.R. Clinker and Anthony J. Lambert. Newton Abbot: David St John Thomas. .

External links
  RAILSCOT article on the Fortrose Branch
 Fortrose station on navigable O. S. map

Disused railway stations in Ross and Cromarty
Former Highland Railway stations
Railway stations in Great Britain opened in 1894
Railway stations in Great Britain closed in 1951
Fortrose